WCVM (94.7 FM) is a radio station licensed to Bronson, Michigan. The station rebroadcasts WBCL, the contemporary Christian music station owned and operated by Taylor University in Fort Wayne, Indiana. The station's transmitter is located near the corner of County Roads E700N and N950E, southwest of Greenfield Mills, Indiana.

Prior to being purchased by Taylor University, the station had aired the Christian modern rock format of Calvary Chapel (originally known as "Effect Radio" and then "Radio X").

Sources 
Michiguide.com - WCVM History

External links

Taylor University
Radio stations established in 1998
1998 establishments in Michigan
CVM
Contemporary Christian radio stations in the United States